Francesca Forrellad i Miquel (27 May 1927-2 March 2013) was a Catalan writer and the twin sister of Lluïsa Forrellad.

References

1927 births
2013 deaths
Women writers from Catalonia
20th-century Spanish women writers
21st-century Spanish women writers
Spanish twins